Golden Salamander may refer to 

 The Golden Salamander, a 1949 thriller novel by Victor Canning
 Golden Salamander (film), a 1950 film adaptation starring Trevor Howard
 "The Golden Salamander", a song on the Acoustic Squabs album Baroque & Roll

See also
 Salamandra atra aurorae, often called the golden alpine salamander, a subspecies of the alpine salamander